The 2017–18 Indian Women's League season was the second season of the Indian Women's League, a women's football league in India. The qualifiers for the league will start from 25 November 2017. Rising Student's Club won the 2017–18 Indian Women's League.

Preliminary round

The preliminary round was scheduled to be held from 25 November 2017 to 8 December 2017 at Rajarshi Shahu Stadium in Kolhapur. Thirteen teams entered the preliminary round. Teams were split into two groups and the top-ranked team from each group qualified for the final round.

Teams

Team locations

Rising Student's Club and Eastern Sporting Union qualified for final round by topping Group A and Group B respectively. Due to unavailability of teams from I-League and Indian Super League,  four more teams from qualification round Sethu FC, Indira Gandhi AS&E, India Rush Soccer and KRYPHSA are promoted to final round.

Foreign players

Final round

Final round will be played among seven teams who face each other once with the top four teams advancing to the semifinals. Gokulam Kerala FC women's team will be joined by Six teams from preliminary round.

Group stage

Knock-out Stage

|-
!colspan=4|Semifinals
 
 
|-
!colspan=4|Final
  
|}

Season awards
Hero Indian Women's League 2017–18 awards were given on April 14.

References

External links
 All India Football Federation.

Indian Women's League
2017–18 in Indian football leagues
2017–18 domestic women's association football leagues
Ind